U ritmu srca malog dobošara (trans. In the Rhythm of the Little Drummer's Heart) is the first solo album released by Vicko Milatović.

The cover art was previously created by cartoonist Jugoslav Vlahović for Alisa's debut album Alisa, but was refused by the band members as "too morbid".

Track listing
All the songs were written by Milatović with help from Miodrag Živadinović.
"Dođi mala, igraj tvist" – 3:09
"Gotovo je" – 3:04
"Pesma od 128 kila" – 2:50
"Indira" – 3:44
"Teška noć" – 4:24
"Štule Zombi" – 3:10
"Crnkinje" – 3:04
"Gluvarenje" – 4:12
"Zaboravi me" – 5:22

Personnel
Vicko Milatović - vocals
Miodrag Živadinović - guitar
Dragan Deletić - guitar
Dragan Gajić - drums
Zoran Radovanović - drums

References
 EX YU ROCK enciklopedija 1960-2006,  Janjatović Petar;  

Vicko Milatović albums
1986 debut albums
PGP-RTB albums